The Sony α6500 (model ILCE-6500) is a compact digital camera announced on 6 October 2016 shortly after photokina 2016.

The α6500 features a 24 megapixel Exmor sensor with 425 phase detection autofocus points. The camera is powered by Sony's Bionz X image processor with an ISO range up to 51,200. Additionally, the α6500 can shoot images at up to 11 frames per second with continuous autofocus and exposure tracking.

The mirrorless interchangeable lens camera (MILC) is also the first Sony model to integrate a 5-axis image stabilizator in a body with an APSC sensor. Sony claims an autofocus performance as short as 0.05 seconds.

Lens compatibility
Sony E-mount lenses, both full-frame (FE) and APS-C (E) are compatible with the α6500.

See also 

 List of Sony E-mount cameras
 Sony α6000
 Sony α6300
 Sony α6400
 Sony α6600
 Sony α9

Mobile phone application
There is an application (Image Edge Mobile) which allows a user to control the Sony A6000-A6500 camera. The application also allows a user to transfer photos over wireless to the user's mobile phone.

References

α6500
Live-preview digital cameras
Cameras introduced in 2016